Ray Fisher Stadium is a baseball stadium in Ann Arbor, Michigan.  It is the home field of the University of Michigan Wolverines college baseball team.

The stadium holds 4,000 people and opened in 1923.  Ray Fisher Stadium received extensive renovations and was reopened as part of the University's Wilpon Baseball and Softball Complex in 2008.  The stadium's location was formerly known as Ferry Field prior to its dedication on May 23, 1970 as Ray Fisher Stadium. It is named for former Michigan baseball coach Ray Fisher who coached the University's baseball teams from 1921 through 1958.

In 2010, the Wolverines ranked 44th among Division I baseball programs in attendance, averaging 1,278 per home game, while the stadium holds 2,800 people.

The stadium has hosted ten Big Ten Conference baseball tournaments, in 1981, 1983, 1985, 1987, 1988, 1989, 1997, 2006, 2007 and 2008.  Michigan won the tournament on its home field in 1981, 1983, 1987, 2006, and 2008.

Gallery

See also
 List of NCAA Division I baseball venues

References

External links

Official Ray Fisher Stadium information page
Ray Fisher Stadium at Stadium Journey

College baseball venues in the United States
Baseball venues in Michigan
Michigan Wolverines baseball
Michigan Wolverines sports venues
Sports venues completed in 1923
University of Michigan campus
1923 establishments in Michigan